Hoover Park is a playground on the east side of Hartford City, Indiana. Hartford City is the county seat of Blackford County, Indiana. The park celebrated its 100th anniversary in 2016.

Geography
The park is located on Mill Street between Grant and Elm Streets, in Hartford City, Indiana.

Notes

Parks in Indiana
Playgrounds